Aldo Gordini (20 May 1921 – 28 January 1995) was a racing driver from France. Born in Bologna, Italy, he was the son of Amédée Gordini, owner of the French sports car manufacturer Gordini. Aldo worked for the family's racing team as a mechanic and occasionally drove in Grand Prix motor racing events and Formula Two races.

He participated in one Formula One World Championship race on 1 July 1951 as well as one non-Championship Formula One race. That same year he also drove for the Gordini team at the 24 hours of Le Mans but fuel pump problems forced him out of the race.

Aldo Gordini died in Paris in 1995.

Complete Formula One World Championship results
(key)

Non-Championship Formula One results
(key)

References

1921 births
1995 deaths
Grand Prix drivers
French racing drivers
French Formula One drivers
Gordini Formula One drivers
French people of Italian descent
Sportspeople from Bologna
24 Hours of Le Mans drivers